A mochila (Spanish, pronounced [mo-chee-lah], for "knapsack", "pack", "pouch") is a removable lightweight leather cover put over a horse's saddle. In the 19th century, it was used as a mail bag by the Pony Express. Slits were cut through the eighth-inch leather to allow access to the saddle horn and cantle.

Riders of the Pony Express made quick exchanges to new fresh horses, usually within a few minutes, at each remount station on their route across the United States. The mochila was removed from the exhausted horse and swiftly placed over the saddle of the fresh waiting horse.

Etymology
Linguist Joan Corominas derived the Spanish mochila from mochil ("delivery boy"), itself from Basque mutil ("boy"). The word "mochila" connotes the soft sheepskin leather.

History and usage 

Saddle bag mail pouches were never in use on the Pony Express system because of their unwieldiness. The normal large saddle bags could not be attached to a saddle efficiently and would cause much delay when switching from an exhausted horse to a fresh horse at a Pony Express station. In 1860, the Pony Express developed a fast mail delivery system using a special saddle mail bag cover called a mochila that made the Pony Express unique. The cover, which had four hard leather boxes to carry the mail, was transferred quickly and efficiently, usually in less than two minutes. If a horse was injured on the way from one station to another and not capable of further traveling, a rider would simply remove the cover with its mail from the injured horse and walk to the next station, where he would throw the cover on a new horse. The leather blanket cover was designed by Pony Express rider Jay G. Kelley.

The mochila also had four pockets, called cantinas, that were lockable with a type of small padlock and could only be unlocked by authorized people. Two cantinas were in front of the rider's legs and two were behind the rider's thighs. Documents to be transported in the cantinas would first be covered with oiled silk to protect them from water and sweat. This mail service was very expensive (between one and five dollars per half-ounce, an astronomical amount that only businesses could afford).

Most Pony Express saddles and mochilas were made by Israel Landis' shop in St. Joseph, Missouri. Israel made the entire saddle about one-third the weight of the ordinary Western saddle. The specially designed saddle with its mochila weighed less than 13 pounds. The saddles and mochilas were standardized so they would work from one horse to another. When full of mail and telegrams, the mochila weighed about 20 pounds. The rider would also carry a canteen of water, a gun and a small Bible that included the solemn Pony Express loyalty oath. The saddles for the horses that traveled over the Overland Pony Express route were special and standardized, built by a saddlery firm owned and franchised by Landis.

No authentic Pony Express mochilas have survived. Replicas have been made for demonstrations such as Wild West performances and modern-day reenactments.

See also 

 catcher pouch
 mail bag
 mail pouch
 mail sack
 mail satchel
 portmanteau

Bibliography

References

Sources

Further reading

External links 

Bags
Philatelic terminology
Postal history
Postal services
Postal systems
United States Postal Service